No. 2278 Squadron, Royal Air Force Regiment was an airfield defence squadron of the Royal Air Force.

Formation
The squadron was formed as No 778 (Ground Defence) Squadron at RAF Jurby, Isle of Man on 19 December 1941, having been unnumbered from the previous April. 
On 1 February 1942 all RAF Regiment Squadrons had 2,000 added to their numbers thus the squadron was re-designated No. 2778 Squadron Royal Air Force Regiment.

Service
No. 2778 Squadron remained at Jurby until it moved to RAF Manston in 1942. 
It converted to the Light Anti Aircraft role in May 1943. 
During the anti-Diver operations of 1944 it was based at Maidstone.

Disbandment
No. 2778 Squadron was disbanded in May 1945.

See also
List of Royal Air Force aircraft squadrons
List of RAF Regiment units
List of Fleet Air Arm aircraft squadrons
List of Air Training Corps squadrons
List of Battle of Britain squadrons
University Air Squadron
Air Experience Flight
Volunteer Gliding Squadron
List of Royal Air Force units & establishments
List of Royal Air Force schools
List of Royal Air Force aircraft independent flights
List of RAF squadron codes
List of conversion units of the Royal Air Force
United Kingdom military aircraft serial numbers
United Kingdom aircraft test serials
British military aircraft designation systems
Royal Air Force roundels

References

External links
 RAFWEB

Royal Air Force Regiment squadrons
Military units and formations established in 1941
1941 establishments in the United Kingdom